Zingisa Nelson April (born 19 June 1990 in Port Elizabeth, South Africa) is a South African rugby union player for the  in the Currie Cup and in the Rugby Challenge. He normally plays as a flanker.

Career

Youth / club rugby

April played his school rugby at Ithembelihle High School, New Brighton until 2009 under the tutelage of Theo Pieterse, who guided the school to being named the School Team of the Year in 2012.

He also started in their semi-final victory over the s and the final, which they lost to s.

He was a key member for the  side over the next two seasons, making eight appearances in both the 2010 and 2011 Under-21 Provincial Championships. April enjoyed a similar season in 2010 than he did in 2009 with the Under-19s; he helped the side to top the log after the regular season and then made it the way to the final, where they were defeated, this time by the s. This was once again the case in 2011, as the side reached the final, which they lost to the  side in Wellington.

He wasn't offered a senior contract by Eastern Province and played amateur club rugby for Spring Rose. He also played sevens rugby for the Eye of the Tiger Academy and later played club rugby in George.

Free State XV : 2014

In 2014, April joined Bloemfontein-based side  for the 2014 Vodacom Cup competition. April scored four tries in a match that saw Free State win 77–10 to finish in second position on the Northern Section log to qualify for the quarter finals. April's six tries was the joint-highest for his side, along with centre Nico Lee.

Lowestoft & Yarmouth

In September 2014, April – along with scrum-half Unathi Kongwana – joined English side Lowestoft & Yarmouth on an exchange deal sponsored by Canterbury South Africa. He made four appearances for the team in the London 3 North East league, scoring a try in each of his first three matches and a brace in his final match, a 37–27 victory over Billericay.

Free State XV : 2015

April came on as a replacement in their 21–44 defeat in Pretoria.

Griffons

April joined Welkom-based side the  prior to the 2016 season.

References

South African rugby union players
Living people
1990 births
Rugby union players from Port Elizabeth
Rugby union flankers
Free State Cheetahs players
Griffons (rugby union) players
Eastern Province Elephants players